Rodney Johnson (8 January 1945 – December 2019) was an English professional footballer who played as a midfielder.

Career
Born in Leeds, Johnson played for Leeds United, Doncaster Rovers, Rotherham United, Bradford City and Gainsborough Trinity.

He was also an England youth international.

He died in December 2019, aged 74.

References

1945 births
2019 deaths
English footballers
Leeds United F.C. players
Doncaster Rovers F.C. players
Rotherham United F.C. players
Bradford City A.F.C. players
Gainsborough Trinity F.C. players
English Football League players
Association football midfielders
England youth international footballers